Kongtong is a district of the city of Pingliang, Gansu province, China, bordering Ningxia to the northwest. It is named after the Kongtong Mountains. Kongtong is the seat of Pingliang city's government. At the start of 2021 the population was 534,800, 65% living in the urban area.

Geography 
The district is traversed by the Jinghe River and most of the area has a loess plateau landscape. The elevation ranges from 1,120 to 2,240 m.

Climate

Economy 
The local industry relies strongly on coal mining and processing.

Administrative divisions
Kongtong District is subdivided in 3 subdistrict, 7 towns, 10 townships and 1 other.
Subdistricts
 Dongguan Subdistrict
 Zhongjie Subdistrict
 Xijiao Subdistrict

Towns

Townships

Others
 Pingliang Kongtong Mountain Scenic Area Management Committee()

See also
 List of administrative divisions of Gansu

References

Kongtong District
Pingliang